The predominant religion in Kenya is Christianity, which is adhered to by an estimated 85.52% of the total population. Islam is the second largest religion in Kenya, practised by 10.91 percent of Kenyans. Other faiths practised in Kenya are Baháʼí, Buddhism, Hinduism and traditional religions.

Kenya is a secular country and the freedom of religion is enshrined in the nation's constitution.

Statistics 
Census figures from 2009 and 2019:

Census figures

Christianity

Roman Catholicism was first brought to Kenya in the fifteenth century by the Portuguese, and was spread rapidly during the 20th century by missionaries.  In 2019, the Roman Catholic Church made up 20.6% of the population, about 9.7 million Kenyans. In the same year, over 60%  of Kenyans identified as Protestant, Evangelical, or members of African instituted churches. Denominations include the Anglican Church of Kenya, Africa Inland Mission, the Presbyterian Church of East Africa, Evangelical Lutheran Church in Kenya (ELCK) (and the smaller Kenya Evangelical Lutheran Church (KELC)), and the Baptist Convention of Kenya among others. An estimate 30-35% of Kenya's population are Pentecostals making Kenya one of the most Pentecostal countries in Africa and the world. Kenya has by far the highest number of Quakers of any country in the world, with around 119,285 members.

The Eastern Orthodox Church has over 200,000 members  making it the third largest Orthodox Church in  Sub-Saharan Africa (after the Oriental Orthodox Ethiopian Orthodox Tewahedo Church and Eritrean Orthodox Tewahedo Church). In 2016 two new dioceses were created within the Orthodox Archdiocese of Kenya, namely the Diocese of Nyeri and Mount Kenya, as well as the Diocese of Kisumu and West Kenya, both falling under the Archdiocese of Nairobi, which is since 2001 presided by Archbishop Makarios (Tillyrides).

Other statistically significant non-Catholic and non-Protestant movements include the New Apostolic Church, Jehovah's Witnesses, United Pentecostal Church International, and Branhamism. The non-Protestant and non-Catholic groups make up about 11.8% of the population.

As of the end of 2019, The Church of Jesus Christ of Latter-day Saints claimed more than 14,000 members in 54 official congregations in Kenya. There are also 5 Family History Centers in Kenya, along with an employment resource centre in Nairobi. Joseph W. Sitati, a native of Kenya, is a general authority of the church and current president of the Africa Central Area, which oversees the church's activities in about 16 countries on the African continent. The church has announced plans to build a temple in Nairobi, with it still in the planning stages, as of early 2021. The church has 2 stakes in Nairobi, with other areas either having districts or branches, who are directly overseen by the missions, although the church does not yet have a presence in much of the country. The church previously had one mission based in Nairobi, although Mombasa was in the Tanzania Dar es Salaam Mission, which was organized in July 2020, while a small area along the Ugandan border was in the Uganda Kampala Mission.

Due to the proposed law of right to worship, there have been tremendous increase in number of churches in the country recently.

A 2015 study estimates some 70,000 Christian believers from a Muslim background in the country, most of them belonging to some form of Protestantism.

Islam

Islam is the religion of 10.91 percent of the population. Most Muslims in Kenya are Sunni, mostly of the Shafii rite. Approximately 8% are non-denominational Muslims, 7% percent identify themselves as Shia and about 4% identify themselves as Ahmadi Muslims, as well as a small proportion of Ibadism practitioners. Muslims are concentrated mainly in the Coastal and North Eastern Regions. Nairobi has several mosques and a notable Muslim population. There are large and historically significant populations of Swahili Muslims on the coast (most notably in Mombasa, Lamu and Malindi), in the Western Province, and smaller numbers of Somali, Arab and South Asian Muslims.

Religious Shari'ah courts, called Kadhi courts, are given jurisdiction over certain civil matters such as divorce and inheritance under the constitution of Kenya. Muslims have complained that they are targeted and discriminated against by the government, particularly since the 1998 United States embassy bombings in Nairobi and elsewhere. The religions subsiding in Kenya do not display the distinctions between the 42 cultures. They mainly display the traditions of the larger "umbrella" cultures.

Traditional African religions

African religions are typically based on natural phenomena and reverence to ancestors. The dead are presumed to merely transform into another state of being and capable of bringing good fortune or calamity to the living. Most religious rites are therefore centred on appeasing the dead through sacrifices and proper burial rites. The dead's wishes must also be followed to the letter. 
 
Followers of traditional Kikuyu religion believe Ngai resides on Mount Kenya and say their prayers facing the mountain. Followers of traditional Mijikenda religion have their holy shrines in the forests where they offer sacrifices and pray.

The Maasai, Turkana, Samburu and Pokot tribes also have significant numbers of persons adhering exclusively to traditional African religions.

Hinduism

There are Hindus living in Kenya. The numbers are estimated to be around 60,287 people or 0.13% of the population. They are mainly located in the capital of Kenya, Nairobi, and other urban areas such as Mombasa, Eldoret, Thika and Kisumu.

No religion

In the 2019 Census, 755,750 people reported themselves as having "no religion". This is 1.6% of the total, making this group larger than the groups reporting themselves as traditionalists, Hindu or other religion. 73,253, 0.16%, reported that they did not know their religion. There is a stigma against people who are atheists in Kenya. A Gallup poll conducted in 2012 found that 90% of Kenyans considered themselves "a religious person", 9% consider themselves "a non religious person", while 1% define themselves as "a convinced atheist", placing Kenya in top 10 religious populations in the world.

Buddhism 
Since 1999, Buddhism has grown in Kenya. There are more than 1000 Buddhists in Kenya. Buddhism is also one of the fastest growing religions in Kenya.

Nairobi Buddhist Vihara/Temple is the main centre of Buddhism in Kenya. Nairobi Vihara conducts missions and meditation programs to promote Buddhism in Kenya.

Baháʼí Faith

Present in Kenya from 1945, the religion grew to an estimated 308,000 people in 2005 or about 1% of the population. In the 1990s the Baháʼís in Kenya participated in a nationwide community health project including vaccinations, maintaining latrines and developing clean water sources.

See also
Roman Catholicism in Kenya
History of the Jews in Kenya

Notes

References

Further reading
 International Religious Freedom Report 2006 – Kenya, US State Department, 2006-09-15, accessed on 2007-08-31
 History of the World's Religions (12th Edition), Noss S. David:

External links